Veronica is a brand name of successive Dutch commercial radio and television stations. It began its life as an offshore radio station, Radio Veronica, on 17 May 1960. The name comes from its first name VRON (Vrije Radio Omroep Nederland). "Free" was a reference to the laws at the time that didn't allow commercial radio broadcasters to operate from a location within the (land) territory of the Netherlands.

Though Veronica's appeal and power have waned, most of the Dutch commercial radio and television landscape has been formed by Veronica and its spin-offs.

Television

Veronica's Years as Public Broadcaster (1976-1995)

The Association resulted from a pirate radio station, Radio Veronica, which broadcast from a ship on international waters off the coast of the Netherlands between 1959 and 1974. The wave appearing in the logo hearkens back to that time. The name Veronica is a derivation of the abbreviation VRON (Vrije Radio Omroep Nederland / Free Radio Broadcasting station Netherlands).

After the pirate-activities became legally impossible (31 August 1974), Veronica transformed itself into the Veronica Broadcasting Association (Veronica Omroep Organisatie, short VOO), enabling it to gain a legal radio and television license within the Public broadcasting system. It finally got a licence on 28 December 1975. The first television broadcast of Veronica was on 21 April 1976. Within a decade it became one of the largest public broadcasters and the trademark was tested as being more popular than Coca-Cola.

With Holland Media Groep (1995-2001)

In 1995 the Veronica Association gave up public broadcasting and entered a joint-venture with CLT, parent company of RTL 4 and RTL 5, VNU and Endemol, called the Holland Media Groep, running three mostly successful national TV-stations and three less successful national radio stations. BNN became a public broadcasting association as a part of the Netherlands Public Broadcasting system and replaced Veronica on 15 August 1997, after Veronica gave up public broadcasting and entered a joint-venture with CLT, with BNN first standing for the Brutaal News Network (Flagrant News Network). The name was later changed to Bart's Neverending Network after Bart de Graaff's death at age 35 from kidney failure caused by a rejection of a kidney transplant he received in 1999. Conflicts let to the dissolution of this co-operation in Spring of 2001. RTL rebranded Veronica into Yorin which would finally be rebranded into RTL 7

SBS (2003-)

In 2002-2003 the Veronica Association learned that it could not realise radio and TV in a stand-alone setting. In 2001 SBS Broadcasting B.V., then the Dutch branch of the SBS Broadcasting Group, already bought the Dutch TV channel Fox 8 from the News Corporation and renamed it into V8 in anticipation of Veronica. However, the negotiations between the Veronica Association and SBS Broadcasting were not going as planned and no agreement could be set. In the course of 2002 Veronica cooperated with MTV Networks Benelux and started time-sharing with MTV's Kindernet. The ratings were poor though. At the end of 2002 the Association is even talking with HMG again. Eventually Veronica Association closed a deal with SBS, and V8 was rebranded as Veronica on 20 September 2003.

References

External links
Vereniging Veronica

Mass media companies of the Netherlands
Netherlands Public Broadcasting